was a Japanese swordsman who may have lived during the Azuchi–Momoyama and early Edo periods and is known primarily for the story of his battle with Miyamoto Musashi in 1612, where Sasaki was killed. Although suffering from defeat as well as death at the hands of Musashi, he is a revered and respected warrior in Japanese history and culture. Later Miyamoto proclaimed that Sasaki Kojirō was the strongest opponent he faced in his life.

History
It is said that Sasaki studied the Chūjō-ryu of sword fighting from either Kanemaki Jisai or Toda Seigen. Toda Seigen was a master of the kodachi. If Sasaki had indeed learned Chūjō-ryu from Seigen, he would have been his master's sparring partner. Due to his master's use of the kodachi, Sasaki used a nodachi, or a long katana, against him, therefore eventually excelling in its use. It was after defeating his master's younger brother that he left and founded the Ganryū. The first reliable account of his life states that in 1610, because of the fame of his school and his many successful duels, including once in the late 1500s when he fended off three opponents with a tessen, Sasaki was honored by Lord Hosokawa Tadaoki as the chief weapons master of the Hosokawa fief in the north of Kyūshū. Sasaki later became skilled in wielding a nodachi, and used one he called monohoshizao ("The Laundry-Drying Pole") as his strongest main weapon.

Duel with Miyamoto Musashi

Sasaki was a long-time rival of Miyamoto Musashi, and is considered the most challenging opponent Musashi ever faced. There are a number of accounts of the duel, varying in most details except the essentials, such as Kojirō's defeat. The age of Kojirō is especially uncertain – the Nitenki says that during his childhood, he 

The Nitenkis account initially seems trustworthy, until it goes on to give the age of Sasaki at the time of the duel as 18 years old; it is known that two years earlier he had been a head weapons master for a fief – but then that would imply he had reached such a position at the age of 16, which is extremely improbable. A further complication is that Toda Seigen died in the 1590s. This unreliability of the sources means Sasaki's age could have varied anywhere from his 20s to as late as his 50s. Even worse, a number of scholars contend that identifying Seigen as Kojirō's teacher is a mistake and that he was actually trained by a student of Seigen's, Kanemaki Jisai. The reason for this was that the person interviewed for the Nitenki (the last known witness to the duel) said Kojirō's age but the author missed the first part, and only got the last part which was 18 (十八), pronounced as "juu hachi" - however, numbers in Japanese are spoken as tens and ones, such as 48 (四十八) "yonjuuhachi". The reason his last name is Sasaki can be because of two reasons:
His mother was a member of the Sasaki clan and had him out of wedlock. Since they were not married, he took on his mother's last name. She later married a distant cousin who also shared the same last name, and raised him as his own son.
His mother was unaware she was pregnant with him when she married into the Sasaki clan. Thus, her husband, although suspecting the child wasn't his, raised him as his own son.
Like his adversary Musashi, he was also very tall (about 5  ft. 10 in. or 1.78 m), a giant compared to the average Japanese at that time.

Apparently, the young Musashi, at the time, around 29 years old, heard of Sasaki's fame and asked Lord Hosokawa Tadaoki, through an intermediary, Nagaoka Sado Okinaga, a principal vassal of Tadaoki, to arrange a duel. Tadaoki assented and set the time and place as 13 April 1612 on the comparatively remote island of Ganryujima of Funashima, the strait between Honshū and Kyūshū. The match was probably set in such a remote place because by this time Sasaki had acquired many students and disciples, and were Sasaki to lose, they would probably have attempted to kill Musashi.

According to the legend, Musashi arrived more than three hours late and goaded Sasaki by taunting him. When Sasaki attacked, his blow came so close as to sever Musashi's chonmage. Musashi had supposedly fashioned the long bokken, a type called a suburitō due to its above-average length, by shaving down the spare oar of the boat in which he arrived at the duel with his wakizashi. Musashi came late on purpose in order to psychologically unnerve his opponent, a tactic he had used on previous occasions, such as during his series of duels with the Yoshioka swordsmen.

Another version of the legend recounts that when Musashi finally arrived, Sasaki shouted insults at him, but Musashi just smiled. Angered even further, Sasaki leapt into combat, blind with rage. Sasaki attempted his famous "swallow's blade" or "swallow cut", but Musashi's oversized bokken hit Sasaki first, causing him to fall down; before Sasaki could finish his swallow cut, Musashi smashed Sasaki's left rib, puncturing his lungs and killing him. Musashi then hastily retreated to his boat and sailed away. This was Musashi's last fatal duel.

Among other things, this conventional account, drawn from the Nitenki, Kensetsu, and Yoshida Seiken's account, has some problems. Kenji Tokitsu discusses a number of obscurities and counterintuitive claims that have been identified in the account by him and previous scholars. Would Musashi only prepare his bokuto while going to the duel site? Could he even have prepared it in time, working the hard wood with his wakizashi? Would that work not have tired him as well? Further, why was the island then renamed after Sasaki, and not Musashi? Other texts completely omit the "late arrival" portion of the story or change the sequence of actions altogether. Harada Mukashi and a few other scholars believe that Sasaki was actually assassinated by Musashi and his students – the Sasaki clan apparently was a political obstacle to Lord Hosokawa, and defeating Sasaki would have been a political setback to his religious and political foes. 

The debate still rages today as to whether or not Musashi cheated in order to win that fateful duel or merely used the environment to his advantage. Another theory is that Musashi timed the hour of his arrival to match the turning of the tide. He expected to be pursued by Sasaki's supporters in the event of a victory. The tide carried him to the island, then it turned by the time the fight ended. Musashi immediately jumped back in his boat and his flight was thus helped by the tide.

Weapon
Sasaki's favored weapon during combat was a straight-edged nodachi with a blade-length of over 90 cm (2 feet, 11.5 inches). As a comparison, the average blade length of the regular katana is usually 70  cm (2 feet, 3 inches) but rarely longer. It was called monohoshizao (Clothes/Laundry-Drying Pole, 物干し竿, often translated into English as "The Drying Pole").  Despite the sword's length and weight, Kojirō's strikes with the weapon were unusually quick and precise.

Swallow cut

His favourite technique was both respected and feared throughout feudal Japan. It was called the "Turning Swallow Cut" or Tsubame Gaeshi (燕返し, "Swallow Reversal / Return"), and was so named because it mimicked the motion of a swallow's tail during flight as observed at Kintaibashi Bridge in Iwakuni. This cut was reputedly so quick and precise that it could strike down a bird in mid-flight. There are no direct descriptions of the technique, but it was compared to two other techniques current at the time: the Ittō-ryū's Kinshi Cho Ōken and the Ganryū Kosetsu To; respectively the two involved fierce and swift cuts downward and then immediately upwards. Hence, the "Turning Swallow Cut" has been reconstructed as a technique involving striking downward from above and then instantly striking again in an upward motion from below. The strike's second phase could be from below toward the rear and then upward at an angle, like an eagle climbing again after swooping down on its prey. Sasaki created this technique around 1605.

In popular culture
Like most of the well-known samurai of his era, Sasaki was depicted in several places:

He plays a central role in the novel, Musashi, by Eiji Yoshikawa. His life is described in a parallel storyline.

In various film adaptations of his story or that of Miyamoto Musashi. For example, in Zoku Miyamoto Musashi: Ichijōji no kettō (Samurai 2: Duel at Ichijoji Temple; 1955; Director / Screenplay: Hiroshi Inagaki).

In the manga Vagabond, he plays a central role alongside Musashi and is shown here as deaf.

Tachibana Ukyo from the computer game Samurai Shodown is modelled after Sasaki, just like the character Haōmaru is modelled after Miyamoto Musashi.

In the visual novel and anime Fate/stay night, Sasaki also played the role of a minor character.

In the video game Brave Fencer Musashi, the archrival of the protagonist (Musashi) was named after him.

In the Pokémon series, the original Japanese name for the Flying-type move Aerial Ace is Tsubame Gaeshi. Additionally, the anime characters Jessie and James are known in Japan as Musashi and Kojirō, respectively.

In the anime and manga Record of Ragnarok, Sasaki is one of the thirteen fighters chosen to represent humanity in the Ragnarok tournament. Known as "History's Greatest Loser", he faces against the Greek god Poseidon in the third round of the tournament.

An ōdachi named the "Washing Pole" is a weapon attainable by the player in the 2011 action RPG Dark Souls and its sequels Dark Souls II and Dark Souls III.

In the anime and manga One Piece, Sasaki is one of the 6 members of Kaido's Tobiroppo.

In the anime and manga "Hajime no Ippo", a reference to Kojiro is made, and his sword movements are repurposed as boxing punches.The first time seen in a fight against the protagonist "Ippo Makunouchi" the user of the "flight of the swallow" is "Kazuki Sanada".

 See also 
 Sasaki Kojirō in fiction
 Miyamoto Musashi in fiction

References

Sources
 Miyamoto Musashi: His Life and Writings, Kenji Tokitsu (trans. Sherab Chodzin Kohn), Shambhala Press, 2004. 
 Miyamoto Musashi, Eiji Yoshikawa (translated as Musashi'' by Charles S. Terry )

Further reading
 
 
 
 
 
 

1580s births
1612 deaths
Samurai
Japanese swordfighters
Japanese warriors killed in battle
People from Fukui Prefecture
Bushido
Japanese duelists
People whose existence is disputed